Oscar Möller (born 15 April 1987) is a Swedish footballer. He is currently playing for Åtvidabergs FF in Allsvenskan.

References

External links
 

1987 births
Åtvidabergs FF players
Allsvenskan players
Superettan players
Swedish footballers
Living people
Association football forwards